Colangia is a genus of small corals in the family Caryophylliidae.

Species
The World Register of Marine Species includes the following species in the genus :
 Colangia immersa Pourtalès, 1871 
 Colangia jamaicaensis Cairns, 2000 
 Colangia moseleyi (Faustino, 1927) 
 Colangia multipalifera Cairns, 2000

References

Caryophylliidae
Scleractinia genera
Taxa named by Louis François de Pourtalès